Rich Valley Township is a civil township in Benson County, North Dakota, United States. As of the 2000 census, its population was 46.

References

Townships in Benson County, North Dakota
Townships in North Dakota